Axel Eugen Alexander von Oesterreich (22 June 1910 – 6 September 1988), better known as Axel von Ambesser, was a German playwright, actor and film director.

Ambesser's father was Alexander Constantin von Oesterreich. Ambesser was born in Hamburg and attended Wilhelm-Gymnasium. He appeared as a stage actor in the Hamburg Kammerspiele, and went on to play in the Stadttheater Augsburg, the Münchner Kammerspiele, from 1937 the Deutsche Theater Berlin, from 1942 the Staatstheater Berlin, and the Theater in der Josefstadt in Vienna.

Works
 Das Abgründige in Herrn Gerstenberg, play, 1946
 Begegnung im Herbst, play, 1967

Selected filmography
Actor

 The King's Prisoner (1935) - Tanzmeister
 A Hopeless Case (1939) - Verehrer
 Salonwagen E 417 (1939) - Ursulas Bräutigam Werner
 Die unheimlichen Wünsche (1939) - Jouet, Luftschiffer
 Eine kleine Nachtmusik (1939) - Baron Egon
 Ritorno (1940)
 Traummusik (1940) - Maestro Hutten
 The Heart of a Queen (1940) - Prinz Henry Darnley
 Annelie (1941) - Georg
 Tanz mit dem Kaiser (1941) - Kaiser Joseph II.
 Women Are No Angels (1943) - Richard Anden
 Karneval der Liebe (1943) - Pianist Frank
 Die kluge Marianne (1943) - Baldi
 Der Mann, dem man den Namen stahl (1944) - Fridolin Beidermann
 Das Mädchen Juanita (1945) - Robert Henseling
 The Adventures of Fridolin (1948) - Fridolin Biedermann
 Verspieltes Leben (1949) - Stefan Marbach
 Verlobte Leute (1950) - Hans Schmidt, der Maler
 Three Girls Spinning (1950) - Professor Hartwig
 Dreaming Days (1951) - Herr Berger
 Kommen Sie am Ersten (1951) - Kommentator (voice)
 Der Mann in der Wanne (1952)
 Ich hab' mich so an Dich gewöhnt (1952) - Kommentator
 Dancing Stars (1952) - Sir Thomas Gregorian
 Drei, von denen man spricht (1953) - Direktor Brand
 Die Freundin meines Mannes (1957) - Mann im Flugzeug
 Adorable Arabella (1959) - Lord Fleetwood
 The Good Soldier Schweik (1960) - Narrator (voice, uncredited)
 Gustav Adolf's Page (1960) - Wallenstein
  (1961) - Narrator (voice)
 Breakfast in Bed (1963) - Narrator (voice, uncredited)
  (1963) - Thomas Andermatt
 I Learned It from Father (1964) - Regisseur / Himself - Narrator (uncredited)
 Who Wants to Sleep? (1965) - Ronald
  (1965) - Wilhelm Busch

Director
 Drei, von denen man spricht (1953) — (based on Youth at the Helm)
  (1954) — (based on a play by )
 Her First Date (1955) — (screenplay by Max Colpet, remake of Premier rendez-vous)
  (1957)
 The Crammer (1958)
  (1959)
 Adorable Arabella (1959) — (based on Arabella by Georgette Heyer)
 The Good Soldier Schweik (1960) — (based on The Good Soldier Švejk)
  (1960)
  (1961)
 He Can't Stop Doing It (1962) — (Father Brown film)
 Kohlhiesel's Daughters (1962) — (remake of Kohlhiesels Töchter)
 Breakfast in Bed (1963) — (based on a novel by )
 I Learned It from Father (1964)
 Marry Me, Cherie (1964) — (based on a novel by Gábor Vaszary)
 Who Wants to Sleep? (1965, anthology film)
  (1965) — (based on illustrated stories by Wilhelm Busch)
 Die schöne Helena (1975, TV film) — (based on the opera La belle Hélène)

References

External links
 

1910 births
1988 deaths
German male film actors
German male stage actors
Male actors from Hamburg
Commanders Crosses of the Order of Merit of the Federal Republic of Germany
20th-century German male actors
Film directors from Hamburg
German television directors
German male dramatists and playwrights
20th-century German dramatists and playwrights
People educated at the Wilhelm-Gymnasium (Hamburg)